The name Charter Oak refers to several things:
The Charter Oak, the oak tree said to have hidden the charter of the Connecticut Colony
The Charter Oak Bridge, named for the tree, which carries U.S. Highway 5 and Connecticut State Route 15 over the Connecticut River
Charter Oak Federal Credit Union, a credit union headquartered in Waterford, Connecticut
Charter Oak State College, a Connecticut public college offering distance education courses
Charter Oak, a schooner and cargo ship out of Boston used in the American Civil War, captured by Confederate forces and burned in 1864
Places named Charter Oak:
Charter Oak, California, United States
Charter Oak, Iowa, United States
Charter Oak, Missouri, United States